The Blackcollar is a novel by Timothy Zahn published in 1983. First in the Blackcollar trilogy.

Plot summary
The Blackcollar is a novel in which the Blackcollars are guerrillas who were made redundant by the fall of the Terran Empire.

Reception
Dave Langford reviewed The Blackcollar for White Dwarf #81, and stated that "The conclusion has a touch of political realism which almost makes the whole farrago credible. Lightweight entertainment."

Reviews
Review by Tom Easton (1984) in Analog Science Fiction/Science Fact, February 1984

References

1983 novels